Construction Careers Academy is a magnet school in the Northside Independent School District of San Antonio, Texas, United States. Founded in 2009, the school is a "school within a school" sharing the campus of Earl Warren High School with an academic focus on construction related skills.

The mission of CCA “is to provide an advanced and rigorous curriculum with a focus on construction technology, construction management, architectural design, applied engineering and real-world experience that will prepare students for studies in higher education and/or a career in a construction-related industry."

Students accepted to the academy can choose from one of nine majors to include architecture and design, engineering, construction management, electrical, HVAC, plumbing, pipefitting, welding and carpentry.

CCA offers a wide variety of opportunities for students.  Whether a student plans to attend a four-year university, get a two-year associate degree, or enter the workforce after high school, CCA will provide them the skills necessary to achieve their goals.

Students attending CCA can expect to receive a “top flight” education from one of the most prestigious academies in the state of Texas.  Students will have the opportunity to obtain industry recognized certifications, participate in internships and practicums, earn college credit, and gain valuable skills that are certain to prepare them for the national and global job market.

Students who choose to attend CCA are guaranteed a challenging, rigorous, and enjoyable education experience. Graduates earn a high school diploma they can be proud of, and become alumni of one of the most-recognized schools in Texas.

References

External links
Construction Careers Academy
Northside ISD

High schools in San Antonio
Public high schools in Bexar County, Texas
Northside Independent School District high schools
Magnet schools in Texas
2009 establishments in Texas